Free festivals are a combination of music, arts and cultural activities, for which often no admission is charged, but involvement is preferred. They are identifiable by being multi-day events connected by a camping community without centralised control. The pioneering free festival movement started in the UK in the 1970s.

History

David Bowie's song Memory of a Free Festival, recorded in September 1969 and included on the 1969 album David Bowie, mentions the free festival organised by the Beckenham Arts Lab and held on the Croydon Road Recreation Ground on 16 August 1969.

The 1972 to 1974 Windsor Free Festival, held in Windsor Great Park, England, was a free festival. The 'organisation' was mostly Ubi Dwyer distributing thousands of leaflets and asking people and bands to bring their own equipment and create their own environment – "bring what you expect to find."

"Free festivals are practical demonstrations of what society could be like all the time: miniature utopias of joy and communal awareness rising for a few days from a grey morass of mundane, inhibited, paranoid and repressive everyday existence…The most lively [young people] escape geographically and physically to the ‘Never Never Land’ of a free festival where they become citizens, indeed rulers, in a new reality." Un-authored leaflet from 1980, quoted in George McKay's Senseless Acts of Beauty: Cultures of Resistance Since the Sixties (p. 15).

Free festivals by year

Historical

1960s
 Woodstock Festival, 1969 (partly free)
 Croydon Road Recreation Ground free festival, 1969

1970s
 Phun City 1970
 Glastonbury Free Festival 1971
 Windsor Free Festival, 1972–1974
 People's Free Festivals at Watchfield 1975, Seasalter 1976 and Caesar's Camp 1978
 Trentishoe Whole Earth Fayre 1973–76
 Stonehenge Free Festival, 1972–1984
 Battle of the Beanfield (1985)
 Rivington Pike/North Country Fair 1976–78
 Deeply Vale Festivals 1976–79
 Leamington Spa Peace Festival

1980s
 Elephant Fayre, 1981–86
Jazz at the Lake: Lake George Jazz Weekend (started as a free festival in upstate New York in 1984)

1990s
 Castlemorton Common Festival, 1992
 Free Edinburgh Fringe Festival
 Free Fringe
 CzechTek
 Dragon Festival, Orgiva, Spain, 1997–2009
 Przystanek Woodstock
 Davestock - Vancouver Island, BC
 Heineken Music Festivals, 1990–1995, UK

2010s
 Mile of Music - Appleton, Wisconsin
 Green World Yoga & Sacred Music Festival, Skåne

2020s
 Wisbech Rock Festival - Wisbech, Isle of Ely, UK.

Gallery

See also
 Free party
 New age travellers
 Alternative society
 Teknival
 DIY culture

References

External links

 The Free Festivals 1969-1990 - ukrockfestivals.com
 George McKay - Senseless Acts of Beauty: Cultures of Resistance Since the Sixties:Free Festivals
 Battle of the Beanfield - ITV unseen broadcast

Counterculture festivals
Free festivals
Rock festivals